Victor Lyngdoh is, since 2020, the Metropolitan Archbishop of the Roman Catholic Archdiocese of Shillong. He served as the  Bishop of the Roman Catholic Diocese of Jowai, India, till December 2020.

Early life 
Victor was born in Wahlang, Meghalaya, India on 14 Jan 1956.

Priesthood 
He was ordained a Catholic priest on 25 Jan 1987.

Episcopate 
He was appointed Bishop of Nongstoin, India on 28 Jan 2006 and ordained on 2 Apr 2006. Pope Francis appointed Lyngdoh Bishop of Jowai on 15 Oct 2016 and he was installed on 20 Nov 2016. He also chairs the Bible Commission in North East Bishops council of India.

Lyngdoh was appointed Metropolitan Archbishop of the Roman Catholic Archdiocese of Shillong on 28 December 2020.

References

External links

1956 births
Living people
Bishops appointed by Pope Francis
21st-century Roman Catholic archbishops in India
People from Shillong